Sheffield Olympic Legacy Park, in Sheffield, South Yorkshire, England, is a sports and recreation hub for health and wellbeing collaborative research and learning.

About 
Legacy Park Ltd. is a joint venture between Sheffield Hallam University, Sheffield Teaching Hospitals NHS Foundation Trust and Sheffield City Council, created to deliver the Sheffield Olympic Legacy Park.

On the 35-acre Sheffield Olympic Legacy Park is the English Institute of Sport Sheffield (EISS), iceSheffield, Altitude, Don Valley Bowl, Sheffield Hallam University's Advanced Wellbeing Research Centre (AWRC), Oasis Academy Don Valley, UTC Sheffield Olympic Legacy Park campus, 3G pitch, Indoor Arena, Stadium, Hotel and park environment including 100m sprint track, Outdoor City Run Route cycle paths and green open spaces.

Since 2018, Sheffield Olympic Legacy Park has served as the home ground for the Sheffield Eagles Rugby League club.

In August 2020 the Don Valley Bowl hosted a drive-in cinema.

Facilities

Stadium

Advanced Wellbeing Research Centre
Sheffield Hallam University's Advanced Wellbeing Research Centre (AWRC).

UTC Sheffield Olympic Legacy Park campus

University Technical College (UTC) Sheffield Olympic Legacy Park, part of the UTC Sheffield Academy Trust, is a college for 13- to 19-year-olds, specialising in Health Sciences, Sport Science and Computing. Students can start in Y9, Y10 or Y12 to study a combination of GCSEs/A Levels and a technical specialism (OCR Cambridge Technicals and Nationals).

References 

Sports venues in Sheffield
Sheffield Eagles